Lamar is an unincorporated community in Mercer and Wyoming counties, West Virginia, United States. It was also known as Algonquin.

The community most likely was named after the Lamar family.

References

Unincorporated communities in Mercer County, West Virginia
Unincorporated communities in Wyoming County, West Virginia
Unincorporated communities in West Virginia
Coal towns in West Virginia